Sébastien Leclerc or Le Clerc ([baptized] 26 September 1637— 25 October 1714) was a French artist from the Duchy of Lorraine. He specialized in subtle reproductive drawings, etchings, and engravings of paintings; and worked mostly in Paris, where he was counseled by the King's painter,  Charles Le Brun, to devote himself entirely to engraving.  Leclerc joined the Académie Royale de Peinture et de Sculpture in 1672 and taught perspective there. He worked for Louis XIV, being made "graveur du Roi" (attached to the Cabinet du Roi), doing engraving work for the royal house. Leclerc also engaged in periodic work as a technical draftsman and military engineer.

Of his reproductive engravings, the connoisseur and chronicler of artistic life, Pierre-Jean Mariette, wrote in his Abecedario:

Early life
Sébastien Leclerc was born in 1637 in Metz; the son of Laurent Leclerc (1590–1695), a local goldsmith and merchant, who taught his son the rudiments of his trade. His first artistic efforts were favorably received in his birthplace, where he engraved a city view in 1650; four screens in 1654; and the "Life of Saint Benedict in 38 scenes" in 1658. Le Clerc went to Paris in 1665, where he pursued a continuing interest in geometry.

Leclerc's illustrated Géométrie Pratique was published in Paris in 1668. He was also a student of physics; military architecture; and perspective; while he supported himself by providing illustrations for authors and booksellers.

Marriage and children
In 1673 Leclerc married one of the daughters of a royal dyer named Vandenkerchoven. Leclerc and his wife had six sons and four daughters. One of these, Sébastien "the Younger" (1676–1763), gained a reputation in painting.

Career
Leclerc became engineer-geographer to Marshal de la Ferté. During this time, he executed plans of several fortresses in the Metz area. However, when he heard that the king had passed off one of his drawing's as another artist's work, he was unable to bear the affront and quit his job. Wishing to perfect his skills in military engineering, Leclerc moved to Paris (about 1665), where he could better study the subject. He carried letters of recommendation to the painter, Charles Le Brun. Upon seeing a sample of Leclerc's engravings, Le Brun advised him to abandon the sciences and devote himself solely to drawing and engraving under his tutelage. As the protégé of such a major artist, Leclerc had no trouble gaining commissions. Booksellers were eager to have his engravings decorate their books. His reputation rose quickly.

Sponsored
A sponsor, Jean-Baptiste Colbert, stepped forward and put him up at the Gobelins Manufactory on a pension of 600 écus, with the express condition that he use his talents only in the king's service. (Colbert had designated one of his sons (later the Marquis de Blainville) to replace him as superintendant des bâtiments—Leclerc gave this young man drawing lessons and instruction.)

In 1672, Chancellor Pierre Séguier died. Le Brun was chosen to design his catafalque. He gave Leclerc the task of doing the engravings. He was so pleased with Leclerc's work that he put both Leclerc and his work before the voters of the Académie Royale de Peinture et de Sculpture, who accepted him unanimously on 16 August 1672. In recognition of his previous studies, he was also made the académie's professor of geometry and perspective. At this point, Leclerc could consider his fortune made.

While at Goeblins, Leclerc worked in straitened circumstances due to his pension (now at 1800 livres) and the condition he only work for the king. With his family expanding and his reputation rising, he eventually abandoned this pension and regained his artistic freedom. Thereafter, he worked on a considerable number of engravings. Religious books and contemporary novels teemed with his engravings.

In 1684, Leclerc engraved a plate notable in art history. While Le Brun headed the Gobelins factory, there was a custom of putting up a maypole in his honor every May. Leclerc engraved a scene of this ceremony, in which one panel showed the moment at which the tall tree was dressed with emblems flattering Le Brun, and, a second panel, below, showed the festivities accompanying the occasion.

Royal appointments and other honors
Leclerc was appointed engraver to Louis XIV. He was granted the honorific cavaliere Romano by the Pope in 1706.

In 1710 Leclerc feared losing his sight and was for a while forced to give up his work, though he returned to it, if only for a few years. He died in Paris in 1714 while still putting the finishing touches to his Traité d’Architecture.

Analysis

For his talent at composition, Leclerc is accounted among the best French artists of the 17th century. His catalog was edited by Th.-Ant. Joubert and contains 3412 pieces—nearly all his own composition. He is credited with a remarkable intelligence; a delicacy in engraving the smallest drawings; and a certain grandeur in his treatment of the most grand and lavish subjects. Leclerc has sometimes been criticized for some monotony and for inconsistencies in plates destined for the same book—although such a wide output made some repetition inevitable. Leclerc is held as one of the most able French engravers, alongside Callot, Abraham Bosse and Brebiette.

Print collectors have always wished to gain a full collection of Leclerc's images, but even during his lifetime some of his images eluded them. Potier, a famous collector who died around 1757 and a friend of Leclerc's, began a prints collection quite late in life and his fellow art collectors criticized his taste for that sphere - they smiled whenever he offered to show them his print collection and, to avoid hurting his feelings, stated they were unworthy of such an honour. Understanding the situation and slightly hurt at their disdain, Potier resolved to bring some of his fellow collectors to his house to have his revenge. He invited Leclerc to engrave a print on a subject of his own choice for the occasion and a few days later Leclerc delivered a small image of Venus rising from the waves. Potier paid for the print, took the proofs of the image Leclerc had drawn for him off the market and then invited the collectors to come see his collection. When they came, Potier showed them a small print he said he had acquired by chance, but each collector cried "But it's by Sébastien Leclerc! I haven't got it in my collection, it's totally unknown to me." They then left Potier and ran to Leclerc, where they found not a single proof and were unable to find it in circulation. Thus they returned to Potier and, in searching through his collections for the proofs, finally looked properly at them, praised them and no longer disdained them.

His richly illustrated treatise on architecture (Paris, 1714) was translated into English by Ephraim Chambers as A treatise of Architecture with Remarks and Observations. In a number of editions, it served until the mid-eighteenth century as the only systematized and encyclopedic introduction to the decorative part of architecture, ornamentation and enriched molding that was available in English.

Legacy
Two early sources on Leclerc are the Éloge, by Abbé Vallemant (Paris, 1715)—full of sentimental fabrications; and the Catalogue de l'Oeuvre de Le Clerc, by Charles-Antoine Jombert (Paris, 1774). Edward Meaume published a catalogue raisonné, Sébastien Le Clerc et son Oeuvre; Paris; 1877. An exhibition of his work was mounted by the Bibliothèque municipale de Metz, 27 May-26 July 1980.

Sources 
 Édouard Charton; Le Magasin pittoresque, 1777 à 1786; Aux Bureaux d’Abonnement et de Vente; 1858; p. 236–8.

Notable works 

 Pratique de la Géométrie sur le papier et sur le terrain, Paris, Thomas Jolly, 1669;
 Nouveau système du monde conforme à l’écriture sainte, Paris, Giffard, 1706;
 
 Système de la vision fondé sur de nouveaux principes, Paris, Florentin Delaulne, 1712;
 Traité d'architecture avec des remarques et des observations très utiles pour les jeunes gens, qui veulent s'appliquer à ce bel art, Paris, Giffard, 1714.

Notes

External links 

  The Library of Metz owns a major engraving collection of the artist which can be scanned on demand.

1637 births
1714 deaths
17th-century French engravers
18th-century French engravers
17th-century French painters
French male painters
18th-century French painters
French military engineers
Artists from Metz
18th-century French male artists